Miljevići is a village in the municipalities of Istočno Novo Sarajevo, Republika Srpska and Novo Sarajevo, Bosnia and Herzegovina.

Population

According to the 2013 census, its population was 1,312, with 1,281 of them living in the Republika Srpska part and 31 in the Federation part.

References

Populated places in Istočno Novo Sarajevo
Villages in Republika Srpska